FC Spartak Ivano-Frankivsk was a Ukrainian football team based in Ivano-Frankivsk, Ivano-Frankivsk Oblast, Ukraine, the unofficial capital of the Prykarpattia region.

History
The club was founded in 1940 after the Soviet occupation of the Eastern Poland during the World War II. All previous local sports clubs were liquidated and replaced with "proletarian".

In 1956 the club gained promotion to the Soviet Class B (second tier) by winning a play-off match-up against SKCF Sevastopol in 1955. Since that time, Ivano-Frankivsk had at least one club in football competitions among teams of masters until dissolution of the Soviet Union.

In 1981 until 2003 the club competed under the name FC Prykarpattia Ivano-Frankivsk and in 1989 (the Perestroika epoch) was converted from team of masters to professional club by "western standards". 

In 1992 Prykarpattia Ivano-Frankivsk was admitted to the first Ukrainian Premier League, after being initially chosen to participate for being a runner-up from 1st Zone of the Soviet Second League B in 1991. After being demoted following their first season, the club returned to the Ukrainian Premier League in 1994 and remained there for six seasons.

In 2003 the club managed to preserve its place in the Ukrainian First League only with the help of LUKOR Kalush (FC Kalush) that was financed by the Russian Lukoil and coincidentally merged with Ivano-Frankivsk club after winning the Second League and obtaining promotion to the First League. Upon merging of two clubs, the Ivano-Frankivsk team was renamed to Spartak as a "People Football Club", while Kalush team became Prykarpattia-2. Calling a club as "people's" is very effective in Ukrainian football and later was implemented with NK Veres Rivne.

After the 2007 season Spartak was finally relegated to the Second League, with no money. The club folded right before the start of the next season. Following liquidation of its senior, the club continues to field its junior squads in competitions of Ukrainian Youth League. 

Prykarpattia Ivano-Frankivsk's best achievement in the Ukrainian Premier League was eleventh place (twice, in 1994–95 and 1995–96).

The team's colours were red shirts and white shorts.

Top scorers
 2000 – Andriy Spivak 6
 1999 – Vitaliy Shumsky 5
 1998 – Petro Rusak 9
 1997 – Andriy Zavyalov 9
 1996 – Pavlo Irichuk and Petro Rusak 9
 1995 – Ihor Yurchenko 8
 1992 – Yuri Shulyatytsky 3
 1991 – Roman Hryhorchuk 26
 1990 – Mykola Yurchenko 6
 1989 – Yaroslav Dumansky 13 (Master of Sports of International Level)

Notable managers
 Viktor Lukashenko, 1972 Ukrainian republican championship winner, 1973 Ukrainian Cup finalist
 Viktor Kozyn, first manager of reorganized football club in 1989
 Ivan Krasnetskyi, 1991 Ukrainian republican championship runner-up and admission to the top league, first manager in competitions of the independent Ukraine
 Ihor Yurchenko, 1994 First League winner
 Bohdan Blavatskyi, first manager of the revived Spartak in 2003

Club's Presidents

Honours
Soviet First League
Runner-up (1): 1957
Ukrainian Cup
Runner up (1): 1973Championship of the Ukrainian SSRWinners (3): 1955, 1969, 1972Runner-up (2): 1991Ukrainian First LeagueWinner (1): 1994

Derbies
The fiercest rivalry of the club was with FC Nyva Ternopil. The regional neighbors' games sometimes ended with disorders at the respective stadiums. The rivalry was part of the West Ukrainian football derby that after a while transferred from the Ukrainian Premier League to the Ukrainian First League.

The other rivalry worth  mentioning was with FC Karpaty Lviv.

League and cup history
Ukrainian SSR (Soviet Union)
{|class="wikitable"
|-bgcolor="#efefef"
! Season
! Div.
! Pos.
! Pl.
! W
! D
! L
! GS
! GA
! P
!Domestic Cup
!Coach
!Top scorer
!Notes
|-
|colspan=14 align=center|Spartak Ivano-Frankivsk
|-
|align=center|1969
|align=center|3rd
|align=center bgcolor=gold|1|align=center|40
|align=center|20
|align=center|17
|align=center|3
|align=center|52
|align=center|21
|align=center|57|align=center|
|align=center|
|align=center|
|align=center|Preserved place at the 3rd tier
|-
|align=center|1970
|align=center|3rd
|align=center|4|align=center|42
|align=center|18
|align=center|14
|align=center|10
|align=center|58
|align=center|53
|align=center|50|align=center|
|align=center|
|align=center|
|align=center|
|-
|align=center|1971
|align=center|3rd
|align=center|19|align=center|50
|align=center|18
|align=center|9
|align=center|23
|align=center|46
|align=center|46
|align=center|45|align=center|
|align=center|
|align=center|
|align=center|
|-
|align=center|1972
|align=center|3rd
|align=center bgcolor=gold|1|align=center|46
|align=center|23
|align=center|17
|align=center|6
|align=center|51
|align=center|28
|align=center|63|align=center|
|align=center|
|align=center|
|align=center bgcolor=lightgreen|Promoted/Playoff won over Daugava Riga
|-
|align=center|1973
|align=center|2nd
|align=center|10|align=center|38
|align=center|14
|align=center|5/2
|align=center|17
|align=center|40
|align=center|54
|align=center|33|align=center|
|align=center|
|align=center|
|align=center|For draws, points were counted when won on penalty kicks
|-
|align=center|1974
|align=center|2nd
|align=center|12|align=center|38
|align=center|9
|align=center|16
|align=center|13
|align=center|37
|align=center|39
|align=center|34|align=center|
|align=center|
|align=center|
|align=center|
|-
|align=center|1975
|align=center|2nd
|align=center|12|align=center|38
|align=center|14
|align=center|7
|align=center|17
|align=center|50
|align=center|48
|align=center|35|align=center|
|align=center|
|align=center|
|align=center|
|-
|align=center|1976
|align=center|2nd
|align=center|14|align=center|38
|align=center|13
|align=center|10
|align=center|15
|align=center|47
|align=center|53
|align=center|36|align=center|
|align=center|
|align=center|
|align=center|
|-
|align=center|1977
|align=center|2nd
|align=center|14|align=center|38
|align=center|10
|align=center|14
|align=center|14
|align=center|38
|align=center|52
|align=center|34|align=center|
|align=center|
|align=center|
|align=center|
|-
|align=center|1978
|align=center|2nd
|align=center|15|align=center|38
|align=center|13
|align=center|6
|align=center|19
|align=center|43
|align=center|58
|align=center|32|align=center|
|align=center|
|align=center|
|align=center|
|-
|align=center|1979
|align=center|2nd
|align=center|14|align=center|46
|align=center|19
|align=center|7
|align=center|20
|align=center|52
|align=center|61
|align=center|45|align=center|
|align=center|
|align=center|
|align=center|
|-
|align=center|1980
|align=center|2nd
|align=center|17|align=center|46
|align=center|16
|align=center|10
|align=center|20
|align=center|54
|align=center|67
|align=center|42|align=center|
|align=center|
|align=center|
|align=center|
|-
|colspan=14 align=center|Prykarpattia Ivano-Frankivsk
|-
|align=center|1981
|align=center|2nd
|align=center|20|align=center|46
|align=center|14
|align=center|13
|align=center|19
|align=center|44
|align=center|56
|align=center|40|align=center|
|align=center|
|align=center|
|align=center bgcolor=pink|Relegated
|-
|align=center|1982
|align=center|3rd
|align=center|13|align=center|46
|align=center|17
|align=center|8
|align=center|21
|align=center|41
|align=center|58
|align=center|42|align=center|
|align=center|
|align=center|
|align=center|
|-
|align=center|1983
|align=center|3rd
|align=center|22|align=center|50
|align=center|17
|align=center|6
|align=center|27
|align=center|54
|align=center|76
|align=center|40|align=center|
|align=center|
|align=center|
|align=center|
|-
|align=center|1984
|align=center|3rd
|align=center|9|align=center|36
|align=center|14
|align=center|8
|align=center|14
|align=center|31
|align=center|36
|align=center|36|align=center|
|align=center|
|align=center|
|align=center|2 stages
|-
|align=center|1985
|align=center|3rd
|align=center|19|align=center|40
|align=center|14
|align=center|10
|align=center|16
|align=center|42
|align=center|42
|align=center|38|align=center|
|align=center|
|align=center|
|align=center|2 stages
|-
|align=center|1986
|align=center|3rd
|align=center|17|align=center|40
|align=center|12
|align=center|16
|align=center|12
|align=center|41
|align=center|46
|align=center|40|align=center|
|align=center|
|align=center|
|align=center|2 stages
|-
|align=center|1987
|align=center|3rd
|align=center bgcolor=tan|3|align=center|52
|align=center|29
|align=center|10
|align=center|13
|align=center|69
|align=center|41
|align=center|68|align=center|
|align=center|
|align=center|
|align=center|
|-
|align=center|1988
|align=center|3rd
|align=center|17|align=center|50
|align=center|15
|align=center|19
|align=center|16
|align=center|51
|align=center|47
|align=center|49|align=center|
|align=center|
|align=center|
|align=center|
|-
|align=center|1989
|align=center|3rd
|align=center|21|align=center|52
|align=center|16
|align=center|12
|align=center|24
|align=center|51
|align=center|68
|align=center|44|align=center|
|align=center|
|align=center|
|align=center bgcolor=pink|Relegated
|-
|align=center|1990
|align=center|4th
|align=center|7|align=center|36
|align=center|15
|align=center|8
|align=center|13
|align=center|32
|align=center|32
|align=center|38|align=center|
|align=center|
|align=center|
|align=center|
|-
|align=center|1991
|align=center|4th
|align=center bgcolor=silver|2|align=center|50
|align=center|31
|align=center|9
|align=center|10
|align=center|86
|align=center|43
|align=center|71|align=center|
|align=center|
|align=center|
|align=center bgcolor=lightgreen|Admitted to Ukrainian competitions
|-
|}

Ukraine
{|class="wikitable"
|-bgcolor="#efefef"
! Season
! Div.
! Pos.
! Pl.
! W
! D
! L
! GS
! GA
! P
!Domestic Cup
!Coach
!Top scorer
!Notes
|-
|colspan=14 align=center|Prykarpattia Ivano-Frankivsk
|-
|align=center|1992
|align=center|1st "B"
|align=center|9|align=center|18
|align=center|3
|align=center|6
|align=center|9
|align=center|9
|align=center|18
|align=center|12|align=center|1/32 finals
|align=center|KrasnetskyShuliatytsky
|align=center|Shuliatytsky
|align=center bgcolor=pink|Relegated
|-
|align=center|1992–93
|align=center|2nd
|align=center|5|align=center|42
|align=center|18
|align=center|14
|align=center|10
|align=center|53
|align=center|35
|align=center|50|align=center|1/8 finals
|align=center|
|align=center|
|align=center|
|-
|align=center|1993–94
|align=center|2nd
|align=center bgcolor=gold|1|align=center|38
|align=center|26
|align=center|7
|align=center|5
|align=center|81
|align=center|33
|align=center|59|align=center|1/16 finals
|align=center|
|align=center|
|align=center bgcolor=lightgreen|Promoted
|-
|align=center|1994–95
|align=center|1st
|align=center|11|align=center|34
|align=center|11
|align=center|8
|align=center|15
|align=center|40
|align=center|52
|align=center|41|align=center|1/32 finals
|align=center|Yurchenko
|align=center|Yurchenko
|align=center|
|-
|align=center|1995–96
|align=center|1st
|align=center|11|align=center|34
|align=center|12
|align=center|8
|align=center|14
|align=center|49
|align=center|49
|align=center|44|align=center|1/16 finals
|align=center|Yurchenko
|align=center|RusakIriychuk
|align=center|
|-
|align=center|1996–97
|align=center|1st
|align=center|13|align=center|30
|align=center|8
|align=center|7
|align=center|15
|align=center|33
|align=center|49
|align=center|31|align=center|1/16 finals
|align=center|StreltsovKolotov
|align=center|Zavyalov
|align=center|
|-
|align=center|1997–98
|align=center|1st
|align=center|10|align=center|30
|align=center|8
|align=center|9
|align=center|13
|align=center|33
|align=center|41
|align=center|33|align=center|1/16 finals
|align=center|YurchenkoBlavatsky
|align=center|Rusak
|align=center|
|-
|align=center|1998–99
|align=center|1st
|align=center|15|align=center|30
|align=center|6
|align=center|6
|align=center|18
|align=center|24
|align=center|59
|align=center|24|align=center|1/8 finals
|align=center|4 coaches
|align=center|Shumsky
|align=center|
|-
|align=center|1999-00
|align=center|1st
|align=center|14|align=center|30
|align=center|7
|align=center|8
|align=center|15
|align=center|27
|align=center|47
|align=center|29|align=center|1/16 finals
|align=center|3 coaches
|align=center|Spivak
|align=center bgcolor=pink|Relegated
|-
|align=center|2000–01
|align=center|2nd
|align=center|14|align=center|34
|align=center|12
|align=center|6
|align=center|16
|align=center|36
|align=center|46
|align=center|42|align=center|1/16 finals
|align=center|
|align=center|
|align=center|
|-
|align=center|2001–02
|align=center|2nd
|align=center|5|align=center|34
|align=center|17
|align=center|10
|align=center|7
|align=center|43
|align=center|33
|align=center|58|align=center|1/16 finals
|align=center|
|align=center|
|align=center|
|-
|align=center|2002–03
|align=center|2nd
|align=center|17|align=center|34
|align=center|7
|align=center|8
|align=center|19
|align=center|25
|align=center|54
|align=center|29|align=center|1/32 finals
|align=center|
|align=center|
|align=center|Club was reorganized
|-
|colspan=14 align=center|Spartak Ivano-Frankivsk
|-
|align=center|2003–04
|align=center|2nd
|align=center|4|align=center|34
|align=center|15
|align=center|10
|align=center|9
|align=center|42
|align=center|38
|align=center|59|align=center|1/8 finals
|align=center|
|align=center|
|align=center|Renamed
|-
|align=center|2004–05
|align=center|2nd
|align=center|4|align=center|34
|align=center|15
|align=center|5
|align=center|14
|align=center|34
|align=center|33
|align=center|50|align=center|1/16 finals
|align=center|
|align=center|
|align=center|
|-
|align=center|2005–06
|align=center|2nd
|align=center|10|align=center|34
|align=center|10
|align=center|15
|align=center|9
|align=center|33
|align=center|31
|align=center|45|align=center|1/16 finals
|align=center|
|align=center|
|align=center|
|-
|align=center|2006–07
|align=center|2nd
|align=center|17|align=center|36
|align=center|10
|align=center|3
|align=center|23
|align=center|24
|align=center|51
|align=center|33'''
|align=center|1/32 finals
|align=center|
|align=center|
|align=center bgcolor=grey|Bankrupted
|-
|}

See also
FSC Prykarpattya Ivano-Frankivsk
Ivano-Frankivsk Oblast Football Federation

References

External links
 Extensive historical database for the Ukrainian Top League with some extra
 Database of the Soviet championship from klisf

 
Defunct football clubs in Ukraine
Football clubs in Ivano-Frankivsk
Association football clubs established in 1940
Association football clubs disestablished in 2007
1940 establishments in Ukraine
2007 disestablishments in Ukraine
Lukoil